Thomas Yizhao Hou (born 1962) is the Charles Lee Powell Professor of Applied and Computational Mathematics in the Department of Computing and Mathematical Sciences at the California Institute of Technology. He is known for his work in numerical analysis and mathematical analysis.

Academic biography
Hou studied at the South China University of Technology, where he received a B.S. in Mathematics in 1982.
He completed his Ph.D. in Mathematics at the University of California, Los Angeles in 1987
under the supervision of Björn Engquist.
His dissertation was titled Convergence of Particle Methods for Euler and Boltzmann Equations with Oscillatory Solutions.
From 1989 to 1993, he taught at the Courant Institute of Mathematical Sciences
at New York University. He has been on the faculty of the California Institute of Technology since 1993. He became the Charles Lee Powell Professor of Applied and Computational Mathematics in 2004.

Research
Hou is known for his research on multiscale analysis. He is an author of the monograph Multiscale finite element methods.
He has worked extensively on numerical analysis and applied analysis of the Navier-Stokes equations.
His recent work focuses on adaptive data analysis.

Hou was cofounder of SIAM Journal on Multiscale Modeling and Simulation, and he served as the editor-in-chief from 2002 to 2007. He was also cofounder of Advances in Adaptive Data Analysis, where he is currently editor-in-chief.

Awards and honors
Hou has won several major awards for mathematicians. He received an Alfred P. Sloan Research Fellowship in 1990.
He was awarded the Feng Kang Prize in Scientific Computing in 1997.
He received the James H. Wilkinson Prize in Numerical Analysis and Scientific Computing from the Society for Industrial and Applied Mathematics (SIAM) in 2001. Ruth J. Williams
He was an invited speaker at the 1998 International Congress of Mathematicians in Berlin,
and he was a plenary speaker at the 2003 International Congress on Industrial and Applied Mathematics in Sydney.

Hou has also been inducted into several scholarly societies.
He was elected Fellow of the Society for Industrial and Applied Mathematics in 2009.
He was elected Fellow of the American Academy of Arts and Sciences (AAAS) in 2011.
He was elected Fellow of the American Mathematical Society (AMS) in 2012.

References

External links
 Thomas Y. Hou professional home page

1962 births
Living people
University of California, Los Angeles alumni
South China University of Technology alumni
Courant Institute of Mathematical Sciences faculty
California Institute of Technology faculty
20th-century American mathematicians
Chinese mathematicians
Fellows of the American Mathematical Society
21st-century American mathematicians